An estimated 1,150 species of Lepidoptera, the order comprising butterflies and moths, have been recorded in the U.S. state of Hawaii. Of these, 948 are endemic and 199 are nonindigenous species.

This page provides a link to either individual species or genera. The latter is used when all species of the genus are endemic to Hawaii, the individual species can be found on the genus page.

Butterflies

Papilionidae

Papilio xuthus (Linnaeus, 1767)

Pieridae
Colias ponteni Wallengren, 1860
Abaeis nicippe (Cramer, 1779)
Pieris rapae (Linnaeus, 1758)
Phoebis agarithe (Boisduval, 1836)

Nymphalidae
Agraulis vanillae (Linnaeus, 1758)
Danaus plexippus (Linnaeus, 1758)
Vanessa atalanta (Linnaeus, 1758)
Vanessa cardui (Linnaeus, 1758)
Vanessa tameamea (Eschscholtz, 1878)
Vanessa virginiensis (Drury, 1773)

Lycaenidae

Brephidium exilis Boisduval, 1852
Lampides boeticus (Linnaeus, 1767)
Strymon bazochii (Godart, [1824])
Tmolus echion (Linnaeus, 1767)
Zizina otis (Fabricius, 1787)
Udara blackburnii (Tuely, 1878)

Hesperiidae
Hylephila phyleus (Drury, 1773)
Erionota thrax (Linnaeus, 1767)

Macro moths

Geometridae
Chloroclystis pyrrholopha Turner, 1907
Cyclophora nanaria (Walker, 1861)
Disclisioprocta stellata (Guenée, [1858])
Euacidalia brownsvillea Cassino, 1931
Eupithecia craterias (Meyrick, 1899)
Eupithecia dryinombra (Meyrick, 1899)
Eupithecia monticolans Butler, 1881
Eupithecia niphoreas (Meyrick, 1899)
Eupithecia orichloris Meyrick, 1899
Eupithecia phaeocausta (Meyrick 1899)
Eupithecia prasinombra (Meyrick, 1899)
Eupithecia rhodopyra (Meyrick, 1899)
Eupithecia scoriodes (Meyrick, 1899)
Eupithecia staurophragma (Meyrick, 1899)
Eupithecia stypheliae (Swezey, 1948)
Fletcherana
Gymnoscelis rufifasciata Haworth, 1809
Iridopsis fragilaria Grossbeck, 1909
Kauaiina
Psamatodes abydata Guenée, [1858]
Megalotica
Pleuroprucha asthenaria (Walker, 1861)
Progonostola
Scopula personata (Prout, 1913)
Scotorythra
Tritocleis

Erebidae
Achaea janata (Linnaeus, 1758)
Anomis flava Fabricius, 1775
Anomis hawaiiensis (Butler, 1882)
Anomis noctivolans (Butler, 1880)
Anomis vulpicolor (Meyrick, 1928)
Antiblemma acclinalis Hübner, 1823sim
Ascalapha odorata (Linnaeus, 1758)
Bocana manifestalis Walker, 1858
Eublemma accedens (Felder & Rogenhofer, 1874)
Eudocima phalonia (Linnaeus, 1763)
Galtara extensa (Butler, 1880)
Hypena laceratalis Walker, 1859
Hypena laysanensis (Swezey, 1914)
Hypena newelli (Swezey, 1912)
Hypena obsoleta Butler, 1877
Hypena plagiota (Meyrick, 1899)
Hypena senicula (Meyrick, 1928)
Hypocala deflorata (Fabricius, 1794)
Hypocala velans Walker, 1857
Melipotis indomita (Walker, 1858)
Ophiusa disjungens (Walker, 1858)
Oraesia excavata (Butler, 1878)
Pandesma anysa Guenée, 1852
Pericyma cruegeri (Butler, 1886)
Polydesma boarmoides Guenée, 1852
Pseudoschrankia
Schrankia altivolans (Butler, 1880)
Schrankia howarthi D. Davis & Medeiros, 2009
Simplicia cornicalis (Fabricius, 1794)

Euteliidae 
Penicillaria jocosatrix Guenée, 1852
Stictoptera cucullioides Guenée, 1852
Targalla delatrix (Guenée, 1852)

Noctuidae
Acrapex exanimis (Meyrick, 1899)
Acrapex mischus D. S. Fletcher, 1959
Agrotis arenivolans Butler, 1879
Agrotis aulacias Meyrick, 1899
Agrotis baliopa Meyrick, 1899
Agrotis bryani (Swezey, 1926)
Agrotis ceramophaea Meyrick, 1899
Agrotis charmocrita (Meyrick, 1928)
Agrotis crinigera (Butler, 1881)
Agrotis dislocata (Walker, 1856)
Agrotis epicremna Meyrick, 1899
Agrotis eremata (Butler, 1880)
Agrotis evanescens (Rothschild, 1894)
Agrotis fasciata (Rothschild, 1894)
Agrotis giffardi (Swezey, 1932)
Agrotis hephaestaea (Meyrick, 1899)
Agrotis ipsilon (Hufnagel, 1766)
Agrotis kerri (Swezey, 1920)
Agrotis laysanensis (Rothschild, 1894)
Agrotis melanoneura Meyrick, 1899
Agrotis mesotoxa Meyrick, 1899
Agrotis microreas Meyrick, 1899
Agrotis panoplias Meyrick, 1899
Agrotis perigramma Meyrick, 1899
Agrotis photophila (Butler, 1879)
Agrotis procellaris Meyrick, 1900
Agrotis psammophaea Meyrick, 1899
Agrotis tephrias Meyrick, 1899
Agrotis xiphias Meyrick, 1899
Amyna axis (Guenée, 1852)
Amyna natalis (Walker, 1858)
Anarta decepta Grote, 1883
Arcte coerula (Guenée, 1852)
Argyrogramma verruca (Fabricius, 1794)
Athetis thoracica (Moore, 1884)
Aumakua
Callopistria floridensis (Guenée, 1852)
Chloridea virescens (Fabricius, 1777)
Chrysodeixis eriosoma (Doubleday, 1843)
Condica dolorosa (Walker, 1865)
Condica illecta (Walker, 1865)
Ctenoplusia albostriata (Bremerc & Grey, 1853)
Elaphria nucicolora (Guenee, 1852)
Feltia subterranea (Fabricius, 1794)
Haliophyle
Helicoverpa confusa Hardwick, 1965
Helicoverpa hawaiiensis (Quaintance & Brues, 1905)
Helicoverpa minuta Hardwick, 1965
Helicoverpa pallida Hardwick, 1965
Helicoverpa zea (Boddie, 1850)
Heliothis melanoleuca Mitchell, 1997
Leucania loreyimima (Lower, 1900)
Leucania scottii (Butler, 1886)
Leucania striata Leech, 1900
Lophoplusia giffardi (Swezey, 1913)
Lophoplusia psectrocera (Hampson, 1913)
Lophoplusia pterylota (Meyrick, 1904)
Lophoplusia violacea (Swezey, 1920)
Megalographa biloba (Stephens, 1830)
Mouralia tinctoides Guenée, 1852
Mythimna amblycasis (Meyrick, 1899)
Mythimna dasuta (Hampson, 1905)
Mythimna loreyimima Lower, 1900
Mythimna macrosaris (Meyrick, 1899)
Mythimna unipuncta (Haworth, 1809)
Neogalea sunia Guenée, 1852
Peridroma albiorbis (Warren, 1912)
Peridroma chersotoides (Butler, 1881)
Peridroma cinctipennis (Butler, 1881)
Peridroma coniotis (Hampson, 1903)
Peridroma neurogramma (Meyrick, 1899)
Peridroma saucia (Hübner, 1808)
Peridroma selenias (Meyrick, 1899)
Spodoptera exempta Walker, 1856
Spodoptera exigua (Hübner, 1808)
Spodoptera litura (Fabricius, 1775)
Spodoptera mauritia (Boisduval, 1833)
Trichoplusia ni (Hübner, [1803])

Nolidae
Meganola brunellus (Hampson, 1893)

Sphingidae
Agrius cingulata (Fabricius, 1775)
Daphnis nerii (Linnaeus, 1758)
Hippotion rosetta (Swinhoe, 1892)
Hyles calida (Butler, 1881)
Hyles calida calida
Hyles calida hawaiiensis
Hyles lineata (Fabricius, 1775)
Hyles perkinsi (Swezey, 1920)
Hyles wilsoni (Rothschild, 1894)
Macroglossum pyrrhostictum Butler, 1875
Manduca blackburni (Butler, 1880)
Psilogramma increta (Walker 1865) (formerly misidentified as Psilogramma menephron)
Theretra nessus (Drury, 1773)
Tinostoma smaragditis (Meyrick, 1899)

Micro moths

Alucitidae
Alucita objurgatella (Walsingham, 1907)

Austostichidae 

 Autosticha pelodes (Meyrick, 1883)
 Oecia oecophila (Staudinger, 1876)
 Stoeberhinus testaceus Butler, 1881

Batrachedridae
Batrachedrodes
Chedra microstigma (Walsingham, 1907)
Chedra mimica Zimmerman, 1978

Bedelliidae
Bedellia boehmeriella Swezey, 1912
Bedellia oplismeniella Swezey, 1912
Bedellia orchilella Walsingham, 1907
Bedellia struthionella Walsingham, 1907
10 undescribed Bedellia species

Blastobasidae
Blastobasis inana (Butler, 1881)

Bucculatricidae
Bucculatrix thurberiella Busck, 1914

Carposinidae

Carposina achroana (Meyrick, 1883)
Carposina atronotata (Walsingham, 1907)
Carposina benigna Meyrick, 1913
Carposina bicincta (Walsingham, 1907)
Carposina cervinella (Walsingham, 1907)
Carposina corticella (Walsingham, 1907)
Carposina crinifera (Walsingham, 1907)
Carposina dispar (Walsingham, 1907)
Carposina distincta (Walsingham, 1907)
Carposina divaricata (Walsingham, 1907)
Carposina ferruginea (Walsingham, 1907)
Carposina gemmata (Walsingham, 1907)
Carposina glauca Meyrick, 1913
Carposina gracillima (Walsingham, 1907)
Carposina graminicolor (Walsingham, 1907)
Carposina graminis (Walsingham, 1907)
Carposina herbarum (Walsingham, 1907)
Carposina inscripta (Walsingham, 1907)
Carposina irrorata (Walsingham, 1907)
Carposina lacerata Meyrick, 1913
Carposina latifasciata (Walsingham, 1907)
Carposina mauii (Walsingham, 1907)
Carposina nigromaculata (Walsingham, 1907)

Carposina nigronotata (Walsingham, 1907)
Carposina olivaceonitens (Walsingham, 1907)
Carposina piperatella (Walsingham, 1907)
Carposina plumbeonitida (Walsingham, 1907)
Carposina punctulata (Walsingham, 1907)
Carposina pusilla (Walsingham, 1907)
Carposina pygmaeella (Walsingham, 1907)
Carposina sasakii Matsumura, 1900
Carposina saurates Meyrick, 1913
Carposina semitogata (Walsingham, 1907)
Carposina solutella (Walsingham, 1907)
Carposina subolivacea (Walsingham, 1907)
Carposina subumbrata (Walsingham, 1907)
Carposina tincta (Walsingham, 1907)
Carposina togata (Walsingham, 1907)
Carposina trigononotata (Walsingham, 1907)
Carposina viridis (Walsingham, 1907)
10 undescribed Carposina species

Castniidae
Telchin licus (Drury, 1773)

Choreutidae

 Choreutis sp.

Cosmopterigidae
Anatrachyntis badia (Hodges, 1962)
Anatrachyntis incertulella (Walker 1864)
Anatrachyntis rileyi (Walsingham, 1882)
Asymphorodes dimorpha (Busck, 1914)
Asymphorodes triaula (Meyrick, 1935)
Hyposmocoma
Ithome concolorella (Chambers, 1875)
Trissodoris honorariella (Walsingham, 1907)

Crambidae

 Asciodes quietalis (Walker, 1859)

Ategumia fatualis (Lederer, 1863)
Ategumia matutinalis Guenée, 1854 (formerly misidentified as Ategumia ebulealis)
Chilo suppressalis (Walker, 1863)
Diaphania nitidalis (Stoll, in Cramer, [1781])
Elophila obliteralis (Walker, 1859)
Euchromius ocelleus (Haworth, 1811)
Eudonia actias (Meyrick, 1899)
Eudonia aeolias (Meyrick, 1899)
Eudonia amphicypella (Meyrick, 1899)
Eudonia antimacha (Meyrick, 1899)
Eudonia balanopis (Meyrick, 1899)
Eudonia bucolica (Meyrick, 1899)
Eudonia bucolica bucolica
Eudonia bucolica macrophanes
Eudonia bucolica pyrseutis
Eudonia clonodes (Meyrick, 1899)
Eudonia crataea (Meyrick, 1899)
Eudonia cryerodes (Meyrick, 1899)
Eudonia dactyliopa (Meyrick, 1899)
Eudonia demodes (Meyrick, 1888)
Eudonia empeda (Meyrick, 1899)
Eudonia epimystis (Meyrick, 1899)
Eudonia erebochalca (Meyrick, 1899)
Eudonia formosa (Butler, 1881)
Eudonia frigida (Butler, 1881)
Eudonia geraea (Meyrick, 1899)
Eudonia gonodecta (Meyrick, 1904)
Eudonia halirrhoa (Meyrick, 1899)
Eudonia hawaiiensis (Butler, 1881)
Eudonia ianthes (Meyrick, 1899)
Eudonia ischnias (Meyrick, 1888)
Eudonia isophaea (Meyrick, 1904)
Eudonia jucunda (Butler, 1881)
Eudonia loxocentra (Meyrick, 1899)
Eudonia lycopodiae (Swezey, 1910)
Eudonia marmarias (Meyrick, 1899)
Eudonia melanocephala (Meyrick, 1899)
Eudonia melichlora (Meyrick, 1899)
Eudonia meristis (Meyrick, 1899)
Eudonia meristis meristis
Eudonia meristis halmaea
Eudonia mesoleuca (Meyrick, 1888)
Eudonia miantis (Meyrick, 1899)
Eudonia montana (Butler, 1882)
?Eudonia nectarias (Meyrick, 1899)
Eudonia nectarioides (Swezey, 1913)
Eudonia nyctombra (Meyrick, 1899)
Eudonia oenopis (Meyrick, 1899)
Eudonia ombrodes (Meyrick, 1888)
Eudonia orthoria (Meyrick, 1899)
Eudonia oxythyma (Meyrick, 1899)
Eudonia pachysema (Meyrick, 1888)
Eudonia parachlora (Meyrick, 1899)
Eudonia passalota (Meyrick, 1899)
Eudonia pentaspila (Meyrick, 1899)
Eudonia peronetis (Meyrick, 1899)
Eudonia platyscia (Meyrick, 1899)
Eudonia probolaea (Meyrick, 1899)
Eudonia religiosa (Meyrick, 1904)
Eudonia rhombias (Meyrick, 1899)
Eudonia siderina (Meyrick, 1899)
Eudonia struthias (Meyrick, 1899)
Eudonia tetranesa (Meyrick, 1899)
Eudonia thalamias (Meyrick, 1899)
Eudonia thyellopis (Meyrick, 1899)
Eudonia triacma (Meyrick, 1899)
Eudonia tyraula (Meyrick, 1899)
Eudonia venosa (Butler, 1881)
Eudonia zophochlora (Meyrick, 1899)
Glyphodes cyanomichla (Meyrick, 1899)
Glyphodes perelegans (Meyrick, 1898)
Hellula undalis (Fabricius, 1794)
Herpetogramma licarsisalis Walker, 1859
Hydriris dioctias (Meyrick, 1904)
Lineodes ochrea Walsingham, 1907
Maruca vitrata (Fabricius, 1787)
Mestolobes
Nomophila noctuella (Denis & Schiffermüller, 1775)

Omiodes accepta (Butler, 1877)
Omiodes anastrepta Meyrick, 1899
Omiodes anastreptoides Swezey, 1913
Omiodes antidoxa Meyrick, 1904
Omiodes asaphombra Meyrick, 1899
Omiodes blackburni (Butler, 1877)
Omiodes continuatalis (Wallengren, 1860)
Omiodes demaratalis (Walker, 1859)
Omiodes epicentra Meyrick, 1899
Omiodes euryprora Meyrick, 1899
Omiodes fullawayi Swezey, 1913
Omiodes giffardi Swezey, 1921
Omiodes iridias Meyrick, 1899
Omiodes laysanensis Swezey, 1914
Omiodes localis (Butler, 1879)
Omiodes maia Swezey, 1909
Omiodes meyricki Swezey, 1907
Omiodes monogona Meyrick, 1888
Omiodes monogramma Meyrick, 1899
Omiodes musicola Swezey, 1909
Omiodes pritchardii Swezey, 1948
Omiodes scotaea (Hampson, 1912)
Omiodes telegrapha Meyrick, 1899
Omphisa anastomosalis (Guenee, in Boisduval and Guenee, 1854)
Orphanostigma haemorrhoidalis Guenée 1854
Orthomecyna
Parapoynx fluctuosalis (Zeller, 1852)
Spoladea recurvalis (Fabricius, 1775)
Stemorrhages exaula (Meyrick, 1888)
Synclita obliteralis (Walker, 1859)
Tamsica
Terastia sp.
Tulla exonoma (Meyrick, 1899)

Udea argoscelis (Meyrick, 1888)
Udea aurora (Butler, 1881)
Udea brontias (Meyrick, 1899)
Udea bryochloris (Meyrick, 1899)
Udea calliastra (Meyrick, 1899)
Udea calliastra calliastra
Udea calliastra hyacinthias
Udea calliastra synastra
Udea caminopis (Meyrick, 1899)
Udea cataphaea (Meyrick, 1899)
Udea chalcophanes (Meyrick, 1899)
Udea chloropis (Meyrick, 1899)
Udea chytropa (Meyrick, 1899)
Udea conisalias (Meyrick, 1899)
Udea constricta (Butler, 1882)
Udea despecta (Butler, 1877)
Udea dracontias (Meyrick, 1899)
Udea dryadopa (Meyrick, 1899)
Udea endopyra (Meyrick, 1899)
Udea ennychioides (Butler, 1881)
Udea ephippias (Meyrick, 1899)
Udea eucrena (Meyrick, 1888)
Udea helioxantha (Meyrick, 1899)
Udea heterodoxa (Meyrick, 1899)
Udea lampadias (Meyrick, 1904)
Udea liopis (Meyrick, 1899)
Udea liopis liopis
Udea liopis rhodias
Udea litorea (Butler, 1883)
Udea melanopis (Meyrick, 1899)
Udea metasema (Meyrick, 1899)
Udea micacea (Butler, 1881)
Udea monticolens (Butler, 1882)
Udea nigrescens (Butler, 1881)
Udea ommatias (Meyrick, 1899)
Udea pachygramma (Meyrick, 1899)
Udea phaethontia (Meyrick, 1899)
Udea phyllostegia (Swezey, 1946)
Udea platyleuca (Meyrick, 1899)
Udea psychropa (Meyrick, 1899)
Udea pyranthes (Meyrick, 1899)
Udea rubigalis Guenée (1854)
Udea stellata (Butler, 1883)
Udea swezeyi (Zimmerman, 1951)
Udea thermantis (Meyrick, 1899)
Udea thermantoides (Swezey, 1913)
Udea violae (Swezey, 1933)
Uresiphita gilvata (Fabricius, 1794)
Usingeriessa onyxalis (Hampson, 1897)

Depressariidae 

 Agonopterix umbellana (Fabricius, 1794)
 Ethmia nigroapicella (Saalmüller, 1880)

Dryadaulidae 

Dryadaula advena (Zimmerman, 1978)
Dryadaula terpsichorella (Busck, 1910)

Elachistidae

 Agonoxena argaula Meyrick, 1921

Perittia lonicerae (Zimmerman and Bradley, 1950)

Gelechiidae
Crasimorpha infuscata Hodges, 1964
Dichomeris acuminata (Staudinger, in Kalchberg, 1876)
Dichomeris aenigmatica (Clarke, 1962)
Keiferia lycopersicella (Walsingham, 1897)
Merimnetria
Mesophleps adustipennis (Walsingham, 1897)
Pectinophora gossypiella Saunders, 1844
Pectinophora scutigera (Holdaway, 1926)
Phthorimaea operculella (Zeller, 1873)
Sitotroga cerealella (Olivier, 1789)

Glyphipterigidae 

Acrolepia aiea Swezey, 1933
Acrolepia aureonigrella Walsingham, 1907
Acrolepia beardsleyi Zimmerman, 1978
Acrolepia nothocestri Busck, 1914
Acrolepiopsis sapporensis Matsumura, 1931 (formerly misidentified as Acrolepiopsis assectella)

Gracillariidae

Caloptilia azaleella (Brants, 1913)
Caloptilia mabaella (Swezey, 1910)
Cremastobombycia lantanella Busck, 1910
Philodoria
Phyllocnistis citrella Stainton, 1856

Immidae
Imma mylias Meyrick, 1906

Limacodidae

Darna pallivitta (Moore, 1877)

Meessiidae 

 Eudarcia sp.

Momphidae
Mompha trithalama Meyrick, 1927

Oecophoridae
Endrosis sarcitrella (Linnaeus, 1758)
Hofmannophila pseudospretella (Stainton, 1849)
"Leptocroca" sp.

Opostegidae
Paralopostega

Plutellidae
Plutella capparidis Swezey, 1920
Plutella kahakaha Sattler & Robinson, 2001
Plutella noholio Sattler & Robinson, 2001
Plutella xylostella (Linnaeus, 1777)

Praydidae 
Prays fulvocanella Walshingham, 1907
Six undescribed Prays species

Psychidae
Brachycyttarus griseus de Joannis, 1929

Pterophoridae

Anstenoptilia marmorodactyla (Dyar, 1902)
Diacrotricha fasciola (Zeller, 1851)
Lantanophaga pusillidactyla (Walker, 1864)
Hellinsia beneficus (Yano & Heppner, 1983)
Lioptilodes albistriolatus (Zeller, 1877)
Megalorrhipida leucodactyla (Fabricius, 1793)
Stenoptilodes littoralis (Butler, 1882)
Stenoptilodes littoralis littoralis
Stenoptilodes littoralis rhynchophora
Stenoptilodes taprobanes (R. Felder & Rogenhofer, 1875)

Pyralidae

Achroia grisella (Fabricius, 1794)
Assara albicostalis Walker, 1863
Cactoblastis cactorum (Berg, 1885)
Cadra cautella (Walker, 1863)
Cadra figulilella (Gregson, 1871)
Corcyra cephalonica (Stainton, 1866)
Cryptoblabes adoceta Turner, 1904
Ectomyelois ceratoniae (Zeller, 1839)
Elasmopalpus lignosellus (Zeller, 1848)
Ephestia kuehniella Zeller, 1879
Ephestiodes gilvescentella Ragonot, 1887
Galleria mellonella (Linnaeus, 1758)
Genophantis

Homoeosoma albosparsum (Butler, 1881)
Hyposopygia mauritialis (Boisduval, 1833)
Loryma recusata (Walker, 1863)
Paralipsa gularis (Zeller, 1877)
Plodia interpunctella (Hübner, [1813])
Pyralis manihotalis Guenee, 1854
Rhynchephestia rhabdotis Hampson, 1930
Trachylepidia fructicassiella Ragonot, 1887
Unadilla bidensana (Swezey, 1933)
Unadilla humeralis (Butler, 1881)

Schreckensteiniidae 
Schreckensteinia festaliella (Hübner, [1819])

Scythrididae
Mapsidius

Sesiidae 
Melittia oedipus Oberthür, 1878

Tineidae

Crypsithyrodes concolorella (Walker, 1863)
Erechthias flavistriata (Walsingham, 1907)
Erechthias kerri (Swezey, 1926)
Erechthias minuscula (Walsingham, 1897)
Erechthias pelotricha (Meyrick, 1926)
Erechthias penicillata (Swezey, 1909)
Erechthias simulans (Butler, 1882)
Erechthias zebrina (Butler, 1881)
Lindera tessellatella Blanchard, 1852
Mecomodica
Monopis crocicapitella (Clemens, 1859)(Walker, 1863)
Monopis longella (Walker, 1863)
Monopis meliorella (Walker, 1863)
Nemapogon granella (Linnaeus, 1758)
Niditinea fuscella (Linnaeus, 1758)
Oinophila v-flavum (Haworth, 1828)
Opogona aurisquamosa (Butler, 1881)
Opogona omoscopa (Meyrick, 1893)
Opogona purpuriella Swezey, 1913
Opogona sacchari (Bojer, 1856)
Phereoeca allutella (Rebel, 1892)
Phereoeca uterella Walsingham, 1897
Praeacedes atomosella (Walker, 1863)
Setomorpha rutella (Zeller, 1852)
Tinea pellionella (Linnaeus, 1758)
Tineola bisselliella (Hummel, 1823)
Trichophaga mormopis Meyrick, 1935

Tortricidae
Acleris zimmermani (Clarke in Zimmerman, 1978)
Amorbia emigratella Busck, 1909
Bactra straminea (Butler, 1881)
Bactra venosana (Zeller, 1847)
Crocidosema lantana Busck, 1910
Crocidosema leprara (Walsingham, in Sharp, 1907)
Crocidosema marcidella (Walsingham, in Sharp, 1907)
Crocidosema plebejana Zeller, 1847
Cryptophlebia illepida (Butler, 1882)
Cryptophlebia ombrodelta (Lower, 1898)
Cydia chlorostola (Meyrick, 1932)
Cydia conspicua (Walsingham, 1907)
Cydia crassicornis (Walsingham, 1907)
Cydia falsifalcella (Walsingham, 1907)
Cydia gypsograpta (Meyrick, 1932)
Cydia latifemoris (Walsingham, 1907)
Cydia montana (Walsingham, 1907)
Cydia obliqua (Walsingham, 1907)
Cydia parapteryx (Meyrick, 1932)
Cydia plicata (Walsingham, 1907)
Cydia rufipennis (Butler, 1881)
Cydia storeella (Walsingham, 1907)
Cydia walsinghamii (Butler, 1882)
Eccoptocera foetorivorans (Butler, 1881)
Eccoptocera osteomelesana (Swezey, 1946)
Epiphyas postvittana Walker, 1863
Episimus unguiculus Clarke, 1951
Eucosmogastra poetica (Meyrick, 1909)
Grapholita nr. mesoscia
Lorita scarificata (Meyrick, 1917)
Macraesthetica
Mantua fulvosericea (Walsingham, in Sharp, 1907)
Nuritamburia
Panaphelix
Paraphasis perkinsi Walsingham, in Sharp, 1907
Pararrhaptica
Platynota rostrana (Walker, 1863)
Platynota stultana Walsingham, 1884
Spheterista
Strepsicrates smithiana Walsingham, 1892

Xyloryctidae 
 "Eumenodora" tetrachorda
 Thyrocopa

Major works dealing with Hawaiian Lepidoptera
Fauna Hawaiiensis (1899–1913)
Insects of Hawaii (1948–1992). Volumes 7, 8 and 9.

See also
Endemism in the Hawaiian Islands
List of extinct animals of the Hawaiian Islands
Environment of Hawaii

References

External links
List of the arthropods of Hawaii
Fauna of Hawaii Images

Lepidoptera
Hawaii
Lepidoptera
Hawaii
Hawaii
Hawaii